City of Bradford Metropolitan District Council is the local authority of the City of Bradford in West Yorkshire, England. It is a metropolitan district council, one of five in West Yorkshire and one of 36 in the metropolitan counties of England, and provides the majority of local government services in Bradford. Since 1 April 2014 it has been a constituent council of the West Yorkshire Combined Authority.

History
In 1974, City of Bradford Metropolitan District Council was created to administer the newly formed metropolitan borough. The county borough of Bradford was merged with the Borough of Keighley, the Urban Districts of Baildon, Bingley, Cullingworth, Denholme, Ilkley, Shipley and Silsden, along with part of Queensbury and Shelf Urban District and part of Skipton Rural District by the Local Government Act 1972. The Council, which is based at Bradford City Hall in Centenary Square, governs the whole metropolitan district. The city was granted the right on 18 September 1907 to elect a Lord Mayor.

The district is divided into 30 Electoral Wards, each ward electing three Councillors. Elections are held in May, where one third of the 90 seats (one for each ward) are contested and the successful candidate is elected for a period of four years.

In March 2006, the UK's Audit Commission issued a report "in the public interest" regarding concerns about the procurement process for the acquisition of an asset management system. The report identified weaknesses in the Council's programme management and procurement processes, which the Council accepted "without reservation".

At the local elections in 2015, Labour won 17 of the 30 seats available to hold majority of the Council – on 46 of 90 seats.

In the local elections of 2021, the Green Party won Tong Ward which previously had been a Labour stronghold, having only elected Labour councillors since the formation of Bradford Council.

Three Conservative councillors—Joan Clarke, Robert Hargreaves and Luke Majkowski—left their party to sit as independents in 2021 and 2022, citing internal issues in the local branch of the Conservative Party.

In the local elections of 2022, the Green Party became the joint third largest party on Bradford Council with the Liberal Democrats winning three seats - although they won 14% of the total votes across the district compared to 8% for the Liberal Democrats.

Parliamentary representation 
The council is currently covered by five constituencies with six wards in each constituency: Bradford East, Bradford South, Bradford West, Keighley and Shipley.

Wards and Councillors 

Each ward is represented by three councillors.

 2020 election postponed until 2021 due to coronavirus pandemic

Political Makeup Since 2012

See also
Bradford local elections

References

External links
City of Bradford MDC

Metropolitan district councils of England
Local authorities in West Yorkshire
Leader and cabinet executives
Local education authorities in England
Billing authorities in England
1974 establishments in England
Metropolitan District Council